Mark Alan Clear (born May 27, 1956) is an American former two-time All Star Major League Baseball relief pitcher who played for the California Angels (1979–80, 1990), Boston Red Sox (1981–85), and Milwaukee Brewers (1986–88). He batted and threw right-handed.

Early life
Clear was born in Los Angeles, and is Jewish. He attended Northview High School in Covina, California. He later attended Mount San Antonio College in Walnut, California.

Clear's uncle is Bob Clear, who was a minor league pitcher in the 1940s and 1950s, and a coach with the California Angels from 1976 to 1986.

Professional career
Clear was drafted by the Philadelphia Phillies in the 8th round of the 1974 MLB June Amateur Draft.

A hard curveballer with shaky control, Clear was a flexible set-up man, and an occasional closer as well. Twice he struck out 100-plus batters without starting a game (becoming the first pitcher to do so), and pitched 100 or more innings in three different seasons.

In 1979, Clear was an All Star and came in 19th in voting for the American League MVP. That year he won the June AL Pitcher of the Month Award. He was 11–5 with a 3.63 ERA. His 14 saves were 7th-most in the American League.

On July 6, 1980, Clear won the AL Pitcher of the Week Award. He was traded along with Carney Lansford and Rick Miller from the Angels to the Red Sox for Rick Burleson and Butch Hobson five months later on December 10, 1980.

In 1982 Clear was again voted an All Star, and finished the season with a career-high 14 wins and 109 strikeouts. He had a 3.00 ERA in 105 innings, and his 14 saves were 9th-most in the American League.

His 2.20 ERA and 16 saves in 1986 were career bests, and his 16 saves were 8th-most in the American League. In May of that season, Clear won the AL Pitcher of the Month Award.

In his 11-year career, Clear compiled a 71–49 record with a 3.85 ERA, 83 saves, and 804 strikeouts in 804.1 innings.

See also
List of Major League Baseball leaders in games finished
List of select Jewish Major League Baseball players

References

External links

Baseball-almanac.com
SABR biography

1956 births
Living people
American expatriate baseball players in Canada
American League All-Stars
Baseball players from California
Boston Red Sox players
California Angels players
El Paso Diablos players
Edmonton Trappers players
Idaho Falls Angels players
Iowa Cubs players
Jewish American baseball players
Jewish Major League Baseball players
Major League Baseball pitchers
Milwaukee Brewers players
Pulaski Phillies players
Quad Cities Angels players
Salinas Angels players
21st-century American Jews